Raffaele Celeste "Nini" Rosso (19 September 1926 – 5 October 1994) was an Italian jazz trumpeter and composer.

Biography
Born in San Michele Mondovì, Italy, Rosso's parents had attempted to send him to university, but at 19 he chose the trumpet over academia, and left home. He was a partisan during the Liberation of Nazist and Fascist World War II and operated in Valle Maira, with Giorgio Bocca, and Detto Dalmastro, partisan commander of anti-fascist brigade Giustizia e Libertà to Partito d'Azione of north Italy. After his employment in a nightclub was terminated by the police, he returned home, but soon after departed again to relaunch his career. He soon became one of the best-known jazz trumpeters in Italy, reaching the crest of his popularity in the 1960s. He became known in the UK in 1962 when his recording of "Concerto Disperato" was covered by Ken Thorne and his Orchestra and became a hit under the title "The Theme from 'The Legion's Last Patrol'". Rosso's original was quickly released on the Durium label and also made the charts, but was less successful than the cover. His 1965 worldwide hit "Il Silenzio" went to number 1 in Italy, Germany, Austria, and Switzerland, and sold over five million copies by the end of 1967. In the US it peaked in November 1965 on position 32 of the Billboard Chart. It was awarded a gold disc. He also acted in the 1960s.

Rosso died of lung cancer in 1994, at the age of 68.

References

1926 births
1994 deaths
Musicians from Turin
Italian jazz trumpeters
Male trumpeters
Smash Records artists
Italian jazz musicians
20th-century trumpeters
20th-century Italian male musicians
Male jazz musicians
Deaths from lung cancer in Lazio
Burials at the Cimitero Flaminio
People from San Michele Mondovì